Bonny Madsen  (born 10 August 1967) is a Danish former football defender, who was part of the Denmark women's national football team. She competed at the 1996 Summer Olympics, playing three matches. At club level she played for Malmö in Sweden, as well as Lugo, Pisa and ACF Milan in Italy.

Club career

Madsen was born in Nigeria to a Danish father and Nigerian mother. She moved to Copenhagen aged one year and began playing football as a forward, before an injury to her team's regular defender prompted a successful change of position.

In 1990 and 1991, Madsen won the Swedish Damallsvenskan title with Malmö FF Dam. She later moved to the Italian Serie A, where she was nicknamed: "Le Perla Nera". She played for Lugo, Pisa and ACF Milan, winning the 1998–99 league title with the latter.

International career

Madsen made her senior Denmark national team debut on 20 May 1987, in a 2–0 defeat by rivals Sweden. This was almost seven years before the male national team fielded its first black player, Carsten Dethlefsen. She was dropped from the team after a 5–1 defeat by Sweden in October 1988, but was recalled in February 1991 for the Nordic Cup.

At the 1991 FIFA Women's World Cup in China, sweeper Madsen played the full 80 minutes in all three group games as Denmark qualified for the knockout stages. In the quarter-final against Germany, she played the full match as Denmark lost 2–1 after extra time.

In February 1995 Madsen broke her leg before a 7–0 friendly defeat by the United States in Winter Park, Florida. The injury ruled her out of the 1995 FIFA Women's World Cup in Sweden. After UEFA Women's Euro 1997 she retired from international football.

See also
 Denmark at the 1996 Summer Olympics

References

External links
 
 
 profile at Danish Football Association (DBU) 

1967 births
Living people
Danish women's footballers
Denmark women's international footballers
Danish expatriate men's footballers
Danish expatriate sportspeople in Sweden
Danish expatriate sportspeople in Italy
Place of birth missing (living people)
Footballers at the 1996 Summer Olympics
Olympic footballers of Denmark
Women's association football defenders
Expatriate women's footballers in Italy
Expatriate women's footballers in Sweden
Danish people of Nigerian descent
1991 FIFA Women's World Cup players
FC Rosengård players
Damallsvenskan players
ACF Milan players